Skouras Pictures was an American independent movie distribution company that was founded by Tom Skouras in 1983. The company distributed more than 200 movies between 1983 and 1995, including notable films as Blood Simple, My Life as a Dog, The Comfort of Strangers and Apartment Zero.

In 1985, after two years as a foreign sales firm, Skouras Pictures decided to expand onto U.S. distribution, which by 1986, Pamela Pricking, who was an executive at Skouras Pictures, and sales director Sigrid Ann Davison, will represent a dozen of films at the MIFED Film Festival, and decided that Skouras Pictures is looking for bigger films, particularly in regional countries like Germany, England and Scandinavia.

In 1986, Kelly Neal joined Skouras Pictures as president of its domestic distribution. Also that year, Skouras made a reedited version of Shadey, which received negative reception. Briefly, in the late 1980s, independent film executive Jeff Lipsky joined Skouras Pictures as head of acquisitions, marketing and distribution before he quit to start October Films. In 1991, the company refused to attend the Cannes, among smallest studios.

On July 9, 1990, the company had inked a distribution pact with Paramount Home Video to release their exclusive home video distribution of titles on videocassette. In 1992, it launched a home video distribution Skouras Home Video, with Paramount themselves serving as distributor. In 1993, it distributed the controversial Shannon Tweed erotic thriller Cold Sweat, which had a short-lived theatrical release before going to home video.

In 1995, Skouras Pictures decided to end film distribution, following some scrambling after an attempt to make the company public. In 2000, Skouras Pictures was relaunched with the acquisition of the independent arthouse film The Truth About Tully, and has plans to release their six titles annually.

See also
Fox Theatre (St. Louis)

References

Film production companies of the United States